Paloh Hinai is a small town in Pekan District, Pahang, Malaysia, located along the Pahang River.

Pekan District
Towns in Pahang